Seftejan (also Romanized as Seftejān and Seft Jān; also known as Şefatgūn and Sīfatgūn) is a village in Varzaq-e Jonubi Rural District, in the Central District of Faridan County, Isfahan Province, Iran. At the 2006 census, its population was 1,996, in 462 families.

References 

Populated places in Faridan County